The Central Bosnia Canton is one of 10 cantons of the Federation of Bosnia and Herzegovina in Bosnia and Herzegovina.

The most populous settlement in the region is Bugojno, followed by Travnik and Novi Travnik.

Geography 
It is located in the center of the country, to the west of Sarajevo. The center of canton government is Travnik.

Municipalities 
The canton is split into the municipalities of Bugojno, Busovača, Dobretići, Donji Vakuf, Fojnica, Gornji Vakuf-Uskoplje, Jajce, Kiseljak, Kreševo, Novi Travnik, Travnik, Vitez. The region reports a GDP equitable with the average of Bosnia and Herzegovina more broadly. The region has historically benefitted from agriculture and trade, as well as mineral deposits. The Central Bosnia Canton is the fifth largest of ten and its share of the national population is slightly below average.

In April of 2022, the United Nations' Office for Disaster Risk Reduction recognised the region in a climate resilience initiative.

Demographics 

Of the ten cantons comprising the Federation of Bosnia Herzegovina, Central Bosnia Canton and Herzegovina-Neretva Canton are the only ones in which neither Bosniaks nor Croats form an absolute majority. There are thus special legislative procedures for the protection of the constituent ethnic groups. Bosniaks form a majority in the municipalities of Bugojno, Jajce, Donji Vakuf, Fojnica, Gornji Vakuf-Uskoplje, Novi Travnik and Travnik. Croats form a majority in the municipalities of Busovača, Dobretići, Kreševo, Kiseljak and Vitez.

2013 Census 

Page text.

Border between two entities have also divided some settlements but the differences should be minimal. However, because of this it is not the exact data.

See also 
Bugojno coal mine
Political divisions of Bosnia and Herzegovina
List of heads of the Central Bosnia Canton

References 

 
Cantons of the Federation of Bosnia and Herzegovina